Takht-e Jolgeh Rural District is a rural district (dehestan) in the Central District of Firuzeh County, Razavi Khorasan province, Iran. At the 2006 census, its population was 13,063, in 3,309 families.  The rural district has 40 villages.

References 

Rural Districts of Razavi Khorasan Province
Firuzeh County